The Greek Motorway 8, is a motorway in Greece.

The motorway replaces Greek National Road 8A, which has been upgraded to modern motorway standards. The completion date was scheduled for 2014. Since April 2017, the entire motorway from Eleusis to Patras is fully operational.

Operation

Olympia Odos S.A. will maintain and operate the road for a total of 30 years. Operations will include two Traffic Control Centers built to operate 24/7 in order to handle emergency calls, as well as monitor traffic situations and contact emergency services when needed. Also, as part of the construction deal, 24/7 patrols, worksite protection, timely detection and response to incidents, and special services in the winter, are included.

During the construction phase, routine maintenance and work for all parts of the infrastructure of the existing National roads had been conducted.

Facilities
, there are 4 toll stations on the A8: at Eleusis, the Isthmus, Zevgolateio and Rio. The section between Eleusis and Corinth has 3 lanes per direction. There are service areas in Nea Peramos, Megara, Isthmus, Kiato, Akrata and Aigio.

Construction progress
On September 2, 2016, the first fully completed Olympia Odos segment, the section between Ancient Corinth and Kiato (20 km with 2 lanes in each direction + emergency lane and two interchanges in Zevgolatio and Kiato), was officially opened to traffic, with the presence of the Greek Prime Minister, Alexis Tsipras. Although there were still some minor scale works (mostly on interchanges), traffic flow was not impacted. On the same day, the Derveni tunnels were given to public use. On December 19, 2016 another 9 km opened in Olympia Odos from Kiato to Xylokastro, without the Xylokastro interchange which was opened in February together with Derveni Interchange.

Any remaining segments of the motorway under construction were completed and opened to traffic in April 2017 when the official inauguration of the road took place as well, at the same month that segments of the A5 motorway and the A1 motorway's Tempe tunnels were also inaugurated and opened to traffic.

Tunnels

Westbound (direction Patras) 
 Geraneia Tunnel
 Efpalinos Tunnel
 Aithra Tunnel
 Panagopoula Tunnel

Eastbound (direction Athens) 
 Panagopoula Tunnel
 Derveni Tunnel
 Skyron Tunnel
 Thiseas Tunnel

Exit list

References

External links
Olympia Odos official website

8
Roads in Attica
Roads in Western Greece
Roads in Peloponnese (region)

el:Ολυμπία Οδός